Val d'Anast is a commune in the department of Ille-et-Vilaine, western France. The municipality was established on 1 January 2017 by merger of the former communes of Maure-de-Bretagne (the seat) and Campel.

Population

See also 
Communes of the Ille-et-Vilaine department

References 

Communes of Ille-et-Vilaine

Communes nouvelles of Ille-et-Vilaine
Populated places established in 2017
2017 establishments in France